25 Canum Venaticorum is a binary star system in the northern constellation of Canes Venatici, approximately 199 light years from the Sun. It is visible to the naked eye as a faint, white-hued star with a combined apparent visual magnitude of +4.82 The system is moving closer to the Earth with a heliocentric radial velocity of roughly −10 km/s.

This is a wide binary system with an orbital period of 228 years and an eccentricity of 0.80. It is 659 million years old with a projected rotational velocity of 235 km/s. This rate of spin is giving the star an oblate shape with an equatorial bulge that is an estimated 27% larger than the polar radius. The companion, component B, is a magnitude 6.95 A-type main-sequence star with a class of A8 V:. The ':' suffix indicates some uncertainty in the classification of this star.

References

A-type giants
A-type main-sequence stars
Binary stars
Canes Venatici
Durchmusterung objects
Canum Venaticorum, 25
118623
066458
5127